Hayfork Airport , formerly Q72, is a public airport located one mile (1.6 km) south of Hayfork, serving Trinity County, California, United States. It is mostly used for general aviation.

Facilities 

 Runway 7/25: 4,115 x 60 ft. (1,254 x 18 m), surface: asphalt

References

External links 

Airports in Trinity County, California